The first of the AFI 100 Years... series of cinematic milestones, AFI's 100 Years... 100 American Movies is a list of the 100 best American movies, as determined by the American Film Institute from a poll of more than 1,500 artists and leaders in the film industry who chose from a list of 400 nominated movies. The 100-best list American films was unveiled in 1998. AFI released an updated list in 2007.

Criteria 
Films were judged according to the following criteria:

 Feature length: Narrative format, at least 60 minutes long.
 American film: English language, with significant creative and/or financial production elements from the United States.  (Certain films, notably The Bridge on the River Kwai, 2001: A Space Odyssey and Lawrence of Arabia, were British-made but funded and distributed by American studios. The Lord of the Rings was New Zealand-made with American funding.)
 Critical recognition: Formal commendation in print.
 Major award winner: Recognition from competitive events including awards from organizations in the film community and major film festivals.
 Popularity over time: Including figures for box office adjusted for inflation, television broadcasts and syndication, and home video sales and rentals.
 Historical significance: A film's mark on the history of the moving image through technical innovation, visionary narrative devices or other groundbreaking achievements.
 Cultural impact: A film's mark on American society in matters of style and substance.

List

2007 changes
Twenty-three films were replaced in the 2007 10th anniversary list. Doctor Zhivago, previously ranked #39, was the highest-ranked film to be dropped from the updated list, while The General (at #18) was the highest-ranked new entry.

Broadcast history

Presentation broadcast on CBS 
A 145-minute presentation of the 100 films aired on CBS on June 16, 1998.

Presentation broadcast on TNT 
A 460-minute version aired as a 10-part series on TNT, narrated by James Woods and hosted by American talents as follows:

Richard Gere hosted the episode "Against the Grain"
Richard Gere hosted the episode "Against the Law"
Sally Field hosted the episode "Family Portraits"
Jodie Foster hosted the episode "In Search of..."
Sally Field hosted the episode "Love Crazy"
Richard Gere hosted the episode "War & Peace"
Sally Field hosted the episode "The Wilder Shores of Love"
Jodie Foster hosted the episode "The Antiheroes"
Richard Gere hosted the episode "Out of Control"
Jodie Foster hosted the episode "Fantastic Flights"

Presentation broadcast on TNT UK 
Another version of the same 460-minute program was produced by Monique De Villiers and John Heyman from A World Production company to British television and market featuring different interviews and each segment being hosted by British talents in the following order:
 Michael Caine hosted and narrated episode "Against the Grain"
 Ray Winstone hosted and narrated "Beyond the Law"
 Emily Watson hosted and narrated "Family Portraits"
 Richard Harris hosted and narrated "In Search of..."
 Joely Richardson hosted and narrated episode "Love Crazy"
 Jeremy Irons hosted and narrated episode "War and Peace"
 Liam Neeson hosted and narrated episode "The Wilder Shores of Love"
 Judi Dench hosted and narrated episode "The Anti-Heroes"
 Jude Law hosted and narrated episode "Out of Control"
 Helena Bonham Carter hosted and narrated "Fantastic Flights"

Criticisms
As with awards, the list of those who vote and the final vote tally are not released to the public, nor the criteria for how the 400 nominated films have been selected.

On June 26, 1998, the Chicago Reader published an article by film critic Jonathan Rosenbaum which offers a detailed response to the movies in the AFI list, as well as criticism of the AFI's appropriation of British films, such as Lawrence of Arabia (albeit with aforementioned American funding) and The Third Man. Rosenbaum also produced an alternative list of 100 American movies that he felt had been overlooked by the AFI. Rosenbaum chose to present this alternative list alphabetically since to rank them according to merit would be "tantamount to ranking oranges over apples or declaring cherries superior to grapes."

The AFI's 100 Years...100 Movies (10th Anniversary Edition) list includes five titles from Rosenbaum's list (including Do the Right Thing), and the accompanying promotional poster lists the titles in alphabetical order.

See also
 BFI Top 100 British films
 List of films considered the best

References

External links
 AFI 100 Years...100 Movies (1998 edition)
 AFI 100 Years...100 Movies (2007 edition)
 List of the 400 nominated movies (1998 edition)
 List of the 400 nominated movies (2007 edition)
 Montreal Mirror editorial
 SFM Entertainment page on the special; includes video clip

AFI 100 Years... series
Centennial anniversaries